A series of protests in Eswatini against the monarchy and for democratisation began in late June 2021. Starting as a peaceful protest on 20 June, they escalated after 25 June into violence and looting over the weekend as the government took a hardline stance against the demonstrations and prohibited the delivery of petitions.

Background and cause

Eswatini is one of the world’s few countries (and the only in Africa) that is an absolute monarchy, with Mswati III having been the king since 1986. Political parties have been banned since 1973, under the preceding king Sobhuza II, due to a "state of emergency" that has remained to this day, and are heavily persecuted under "anti-terrorism" laws. The prime minister is appointed by the monarch. Although protests are reportedly rare, there have been demonstrations in 2018 and 2019 over Mswati III's lavish lifestyle and alleged misuse of public funds. A series of UN-hosted discussions in 2020 displayed support for a democratic, constitutional monarchy in the country. According to Afrobarometer, trust in government institutions, including the monarchy, has significantly decreased over the past several years and citizens are seeking alternatives to authoritarian rule, although only 49% support a democratic administration over other forms of government.

The immediate cause of the protest was when three pro-democracy MPs advocated for the introduction of a more democratic system. In addition, the death of a college student under mysterious circumstances in May led to suspicions that the police had killed him and subsequent protests at the time, which were supported by opposition legislators and led to a state of preexisting tension.

Events
The first protests took place on 20 June when rural youth in Manzini Region went through a village shouting political slogans and calling for the right to a democratically chosen prime minister. They blocked roads and set tyres on fire. Police reacted to these demonstrations by deploying stun grenades and firing live bullets, leading to protesters retaliating by throwing rocks.

The protests spread and escalated into violence on 25 June in Msunduza township, near Mbabane, as demonstrators "clashed" with police and stores were looted and burned. As thousands of people delivered petitions to tinkhundla authorities, who are democratically appointed in a "devolved" system, the government stopped them from being delivered, raising controversy from the national teachers union and leading to further unrest.

On the night of 28–29 June, it was speculated that Mswati III had fled Eswatini amidst increasing disorder. The government denied these reports. However, it was reported that his private plane had been spotted departing the country. The Communist Party of eSwatini claimed that he had fled to South Africa, while the Swaziland Solidarity Network said that he was in Mozambique and had instructed security forces to "brutally suppress" the protests. On 29 June 2021, the demonstrations continued with police trying to repel the protesters with gunfire and tear gas with both the riot police and the army present on the streets. Police also set blockades across the capital and the government closed schools and bus stations. A curfew was put into place between 18:00 and 5:00 by the government to try to rout the violence, and business and schools were made to close. Despite this, protests and looting continued on the 30th, and the police and army used deadly force against demonstrators, with internet access becoming limited.

The army was officially called in on 1 July to "protect critical national infrastructure and enforce the COVID-19 regulations", according to acting Prime Minister, Themba Masuku, who also state that this didn't mean martial law was in place.

As of late September, high school and university students were still protesting by launching a series of strikes.

On 1 October, thousands of protesters marched to the embassy of the United States in Mbabane to deliver a petition. Security forces dispersed the crowd with rubber bullets, teargas and live ammunition. One protester was reportedly shot in the head by police outside parliament.

On 22 October, police violently suppressed a protest of civil servants, injuring 30 nurses. In response, the  Swaziland Democratic Nurses Union (SDNU) issued a statement that nurses are no longer treating police officers.

Effects in South Africa
At the border city of Oshoek, hundreds of trucks were stranded due to allegations of protesters targeting imports and the loss of internet halting entry processing. The South African National Defence Force was requested to prevent further violence and losses by putting the trucks under their protection. On 1 July, the Economic Freedom Fighters forced the checkpoint in Mananga to close in support of the protests.

Reactions
According to the Times of Swaziland, a number of government figures encouraged violence and a hard crackdown through their statements. National Commissioner of Police William Dlamini stated that the protests were "war"; although he later clarified that he still wished for calm and only wished to show that the police were dedicated to restoring order, the editor of the Times blamed this statement, the  prohibition of petitions, and a call from Housing and Urban Development Minister Prince Simelane to "fight fire with fire" for inflaming the situation.

The largest opposition party, the People's United Democratic Movement, announced a press conference to be held on 29 June. According to party leader Wandile Dludlu, over 250 people had been injured, some with bullets and broken bones, by government forces.

International NGO Human Rights Watch called for the government to "avoid arbitrary use of force" and that the protests should be "a wake-up call for the king and his government to heed the legitimate calls for reform", and the regional director of Amnesty International called the government's response a "full-frontal assault on human rights".

The governments of South Africa, the United States and the United Kingdom also expressed their concern, called for peace to be restored and stated that the right to peaceful protest should be heeded. The US also deployed additional marines to its embassy in Eswatini to bolster its security. South Africa's ruling party, the African National Congress, supported the reforms.

On 3 July, the Southern African Development Community (SADC) announced they would send a group of ministers to resolve the situation. On 21 October, Cyril Ramaphosa, in his capacity as chairperson of the security section of SADC, dispatched a multi-national team to meet with King Mswati III. The team is led by Jeff Radebe, and includes officials from South Africa, Namibia and Botswana.

A feature film documentary entitled The Unthinkable was released on YouTube and SABC1 Cutting Edge outlining the events and accounts of the survivors of the massacre. The film was produced and directed by Comfort Ndzinisa in association with Eswatini Solidarity Fund.

References

2021 protests
2022 protests
2023 protests
2021 in Eswatini
2022 in Eswatini
2023 in Eswatini
June 2021 events in Africa
July 2021 events in Africa
August 2021 events in Africa
September 2021 events in Africa
October 2021 events in Africa